The E. J. Ourso College of Business is Louisiana State University's business school and was established originally in 1928 as the College of Commerce. It is located in the Louisiana State University Business Education Complex.

History
As early as 1899, LSU organized a four-year course in commerce, leading to a bachelor's degree. On June 11, 1928, the University Board of Supervisors established the College of Commerce at its annual meeting. The college would be housed in Himes Hall with J. B. Trant presiding as dean.
In 1959, the college was reorganized and renamed the College of Business Administration. Almost 20 years, later, the college found a new home in the Center for Engineering and Business Administration (CEBA), which has since been renamed Patrick F. Taylor Hall. Another renaming of the college took place in 1996, when "E. J. Ourso" was added to honor the college's benefactor. In 2005, “Administration” was dropped from the college's name.

Degrees

Undergraduate
Accredited by the Association to Advance Collegiate Schools of Business (AACSB) continuously since 1931, the E. J. Ourso College offers undergraduate degrees in:
Accounting
Economics
Entrepreneurship
Finance
General Business
Information Systems & Decision Science
International Trade & Finance
Management
Marketing

Graduate
The E. J. Ourso College offers a master's in accountancy, analytics, economics, finance, and public administration and is recognized for its LSU Flores MBA Program. PhDs are offered in:

Accounting LSU Department of Accounting
Economics LSU Department of Economics
Finance (LSU Department of Finance) 
Information Systems & Decision Science

The E. J. Ourso College is home to several noteworthy centers and institutes and houses the LSU Center for Internal Auditing, recognized by the Institute of Internal Auditors.

It is certified by the Association to Advance Collegiate Schools of Business.

Facilities

The 156,000 square-foot facility serves as the college's home.

Arts
The Business Education Complex is decorated with multiple pieces of art, all commissioned by LSU E. J. Ourso College alumnus Roger Ogden.

The Business Education Complex is home to a massive piece of art created specifically for it by renowned New Orleans-based artist Simon Gunning. Measuring five feet tall by 20 feet wide, “Sunrise at the Rookery”, is divided into five separate panels that together form a traditional Louisiana swamp scene that features indigenous flora and fauna.

Francis Pavy's “Louisiana Wetlands”, located in the Bert S. Turner Family Lobby of The Auditorium, is a harmony of images symbolic of the state's bayous, marshes and swamps. Featuring a wide array of colors and stenciled on elements, the five-foot tall, 20-foot wide piece was completed to commemorate the 200th anniversary of Louisiana's statehood.

The latest artistic addition, CELEBRATE, was dedicated October 29, 2013. CELEBRATE is a 20-foot tall, Corten steel sculpture with mirror finished stainless steel ends on each of the six geometric forms that comprise the work. The sculpture was created by artist Gary Slater.

See also

List of United States business school rankings
List of business schools in the United States

References

External links
 

Louisiana State University
Business schools in Louisiana
1928 establishments in Louisiana